Kvalserien, also known as Kvalserien till Hockeyettan, is the Swedish round-robin ice hockey tournament to qualify for participation in the next season of Hockeyettan (formerly named Division 1 until 2014), Sweden's third highest ice hockey league for men.

Winners 2006–2014

Winners 2015–present

References

External links
stats.swehockey.se – Official statistics for ice hockey in Sweden

Hockeyettan
Recurring sporting events established in 1975
1975 establishments in Sweden
Hockeyettan